Amar Lenin (subtitle: My Lenin) is a 1970 black and white documentary film directed by film director Ritwik Ghatak made for Government of West Bengal in the centenary year (1970) of the birth of Vladimir Lenin.

The film was created by Ritwik Ghatak. It is based on the thoughts and views of Ritwik Ghatak on Lenin and communism. The film was, for some time, not allowed to be released in India.

Initial problems
After making the film, countries such as the Soviet Union and the People's Republic of Poland approached Ritwik Ghatak for him to show the movie in those countries. However, issues arose with the National Film Censorship Board of India which did not approve of the movie and banned it in India. Ghatak and his team had to work hard to have the movie passed by the censorship board. Ritwik Ghatak personally met with Indira Gandhi on this matter.

Cast and Crew
Production: Sumana Films
Direction and screenplay: Ritwik Ghatak
Cinematography: Dhruba Kumar Basu and Shakti Banerjee.
Music Direction: Jyotirindra Maitro and Binoy Roy
Singers: Preeti Banerjee, Binoy Roy, Mantu Ghosh, Anima Dasgupta, Reba Ray Choudhury.
Acting: Arun Kumar etc.

See also
Fear (Short film)
Ramkinkar Baij (film)

References

Documentary films about politicians
Indian documentary films
Films about Vladimir Lenin
Black-and-white documentary films
1970 films
1970 documentary films
Bengali-language Indian films
Bengali-language biographical films